Jean-Luc Prieur is a French ski mountaineer, who competed as a member of the French national team.

Selected results 
 2001:
 8th, European Championship team race (together with Emmanuel Blanc)
 2002:
 1st, French Championship "veterans" class

References 

Living people
French male ski mountaineers
Year of birth missing (living people)
21st-century French people
20th-century French people